Béla Varga (2 June 1888 – 4 April 1969) was a Hungarian wrestler who competed at the 1912 and 1924 Summer Olympics. He won the bronze medal in the light heavyweight class in 1912.

References

External links

 
 

1888 births
1969 deaths
Wrestlers at the 1912 Summer Olympics
Wrestlers at the 1924 Summer Olympics
Hungarian male sport wrestlers
Olympic wrestlers of Hungary
Olympic bronze medalists for Hungary
Olympic medalists in wrestling
Medalists at the 1912 Summer Olympics
Sportspeople from Bács-Kiskun County